Peter Campbell Renner (born 27 October 1959) is a retired New Zealand track and field athlete from Mosgiel, New Zealand who mostly competed in the 3000 metres steeplechase. Renner competed at the 1984 Summer Olympics in Los Angeles and the 1982, 1986 and 1990 Commonwealth Games and holds the national and Oceania record of 8:14.05 for the 3000m Steeplechase.

Renner is a New Zealand national champion in the marathon. He won the 1990 California International Marathon in a time of 2:12:35.

Achievements

Personal bests

References

External links
 

Living people
1959 births
New Zealand male steeplechase runners
New Zealand male middle-distance runners
New Zealand male long-distance runners
New Zealand male marathon runners
Commonwealth Games competitors for New Zealand
Athletes (track and field) at the 1982 Commonwealth Games
Athletes (track and field) at the 1986 Commonwealth Games
Athletes (track and field) at the 1990 Commonwealth Games
Athletes (track and field) at the 1984 Summer Olympics
Olympic athletes of New Zealand
People from Mosgiel